Fred Williams (1896 – 1 September 1929) was a Canadian soccer player who played as a defender for Toronto Ulster United and for Canada.

Career 
Williams was born in Bristol, England and served in the British Army during the World War I. He would later immigrate to Canada and in 1924 he would play soccer with Toronto Ulster United in the Inter-City League and later in the National Soccer League. Throughout his tenure with Toronto he would secure the Challenge Trophy in 1925, and the Ontario Cup in 1927. In 1927, he participated in the NSL Championship final where Toronto defeated Montreal Maroons for the title.

He died on September 1, 1929 from cavernous sinus thrombosis after an incident at work where hot asphalt splashed behind his ear causing an infection.

International career 
Williams made his debut for the Canada men's national soccer team on November 8, 1925 against the United States in a friendly match. He made another appearance for Canada on November 6, 1926 against the United States once more.

References  

1896 births
1929 deaths
Canada men's international soccer players
Canadian soccer players
Toronto Ulster United players
Canadian National Soccer League players
Footballers from Bristol
English emigrants to Canada
Association football defenders
Deaths from thrombosis
Industrial accident deaths
British Army personnel of World War I